Sir Brian John Maynard Tovey  (15 April 1926 – 23 December 2015) was a British intelligence analyst who was director of the British signals intelligence agency, GCHQ, a post he held from 1978 to 1983.

Career
Born in London, Tovey was educated at St Edward's School, Oxford, St Edmund Hall, Oxford and the School of Oriental and African Studies, where he studied modern Chinese. After national service in the Royal Navy, Tovey joined GCHQ in 1950. He was thus the first GCHQ director not to have worked at Bletchley Park. He was knighted in 1980.

Tovey's tenure as director at GCHQ was not an easy one: industrial action in 1981 led later to the banning of trades unions from GCHQ. The decision was also taken to inaugurate the controversial Zircon project.

Following his retirement from GCHQ, Tovey became a consultant advising firms including Plessey on dealing with Government departments. He served during this time as the chair of the Joint Electronics and Telecommunications Security Export Control Committee (JETSECC) of the Federation of the Electronics Industry. Later he was the founding chairman of the UK Mind Sports Olympiad, and Chairman of the Board of Directors of the Learning Skills Foundation and Trustee of the Naval and Military Club.

Tovey maintained an interest in Italian art of the 13th to 17th centuries. He worked on a biography of the life and times of Filippo Baldinucci. It is alleged that while he was Director of GCHQ, Tovey shared this interest with the head of the French SDECE, Alexandre de Marenches, and as a result GCHQ gained valuable intelligence on the war in Afghanistan.

References

 

Directors of the Government Communications Headquarters
1926 births
2015 deaths
People educated at St Edward's School, Oxford
Alumni of St Edmund Hall, Oxford
Alumni of SOAS University of London
Burials in Oxfordshire
20th-century Royal Navy personnel
Military personnel from London